Operation Prairie III was a U.S. Marine Corps operation in Quảng Trị Province, South Vietnam that sought to eliminate People's Army of Vietnam (PAVN) forces south of the Demilitarized Zone (DMZ) that took place from 19 March to 19 April 1967.

Background
Operation Prairie III was essentially a continuation of the just-concluded Operation Prairie II in the same tactical area of operations (TAOR). 3rd Marine Division had five infantry battalions and four artillery battalions in the TAOR.

Operation
On 20 March the PAVN hit Firebase Gio Linh with mortars, rockets and artillery fire and they continued to hit Gio Linh and Con Thien almost daily for the next two weeks. On 21 March the PAVN ambushed a supply convoy 300m south of Gio Linh destroying six trucks but they were driven off by the convoy's security escort and Company I, 3rd Battalion, 4th Marines which was providing base security at Gio Linh.

From 20–28 March BLT 1st Battalion, 4th Marines conducted Operation Beacon Hill around Firebase Gio Linh, killing 334 PAVN for the loss of 29 Marines killed.

On 22 March 3/3 Marines and 1/9 Marines began a patrol from Đông Hà Combat Base north towards Con Thien. On 24 March the 1/9 Marines engaged an entrenched PAVN force southeast of Con Thien and after two hours of fighting the PAVN withdrew leaving 33 dead. Meanwhile, 3/3 Marines engaged an entrenched PAVN company forcing them to withdraw leaving 28 dead. The two Marine battalions pursued the retreating PAVN losing contact with them on 26 March as they crossed the DMZ.

On 28 March the 3/3 Marines and 1/9 Marines were replaced by the 3rd Battalion, 9th Marines which conducted patrols and night ambushes north of Cam Lộ Combat Base. The PAVN walked mortar fire across the position twice before launching a ground assault which was repulsed by artillery fire, attempts by the other platoons to provide support were driven back by machine gun fire. The PAVN then attacked the position again overrunning it, killing 16 Marines. The PAVN were then forced to retreat by helicopter gunship fire, leaving 67 dead and two captured. Second lieutenant John P. Bobo would be posthumously awarded the Medal of Honor for his actions during this battle.

Aftermath
Operation Prairie III concluded on 19 April, the Marines had lost 56 killed and claiming that the PAVN suffered 252 killed and 4 captured.

Notes

Prairie III
United States Marine Corps in the Vietnam War
Battles and operations of the Vietnam War in 1967
History of Quảng Trị province